Xuân Thủy may refer to:

Places
 , a rural commune of Kim Bôi District.
 Xuân Thủy, Quảng Bình, a rural commune of Lệ Thủy District.
 , a rural commune of Xuân Trường District.
 , a rural commune of Yên Lập District.
 Xuân Thủy National Park in Nam Định Province.

People
 Xuân Thủy (1912 - 1985), a North Vietnamese political figure